Didier Défago (born 2 October 1977) is a Swiss retired World Cup alpine ski racer.

Born in Morgins, Valais, Défago made his World Cup debut at age 18 in March 1996, and was Swiss national champion in downhill (2003) and giant slalom (2004). At the 2010 Winter Olympics, he won the downhill at Whistler to become the Olympic champion.

Défago finished the 2005 World Cup season as sixth overall and fourth in the Super-G, his most successful season so far. In 2009 he won two downhill races in a row, the classics at Wengen and Kitzbühel. He was the first to win these in consecutive weeks since Stephan Eberharter in 2002, and the first Swiss racer since Franz Heinzer in 1992.

While training on a glacier above Zermatt in mid-September 2010, Defago fell and injured ligaments in his left knee, ending his 2011 season.

Défago announced his retirement in March 2015, after a second-place finish at the World Cup finals in the downhill in Méribel, France, and had his final World Cup race the next day in the super-G.

World Cup results

Season standings

Race podiums
 5 wins – (3 DH, 2 SG)
 16 podiums – (5 DH, 7 SG, 3 AC, 1 GS)

World Championship results

Olympic results

References

External links
 
 Didier Défago World Cup standings at the International Ski Federation
 
 
  
 YouTube video – Didier Défago – Wengen victory – 17 January 2009
 YouTube video – Didier Défago – Kitzbühel victory on full course – 24 January 2009

Living people
1977 births
Swiss male alpine skiers
Alpine skiers at the 2002 Winter Olympics
Alpine skiers at the 2006 Winter Olympics
Alpine skiers at the 2010 Winter Olympics
Olympic alpine skiers of Switzerland
Olympic gold medalists for Switzerland
Olympic medalists in alpine skiing
Medalists at the 2010 Winter Olympics
Alpine skiers at the 2014 Winter Olympics
Sportspeople from Valais
21st-century Swiss people